Church of St Mary the Virgin is a  Grade I listed church in Keysoe, Bedfordshire, England. It became a listed building on 13 July 1964. Features of interest include the prominent spire, the 14th- and 15th-century roofs and the 14th-century font.

According to local legend, a builder named William Dickens was working on the steeple in 1718 when he slipped and fell. It is said that he was miraculously saved by reciting a prayer in mid-air.

History
The church originally dates from the 12th century.

See also
Grade I listed buildings in Bedfordshire

References

Church of England church buildings in Bedfordshire
Grade I listed churches in Bedfordshire